The Paddy Buckley Round, also known as the Welsh Classical Round, is a long distance fell running challenge in Snowdonia, Wales. The route is a circuit of just over 100 km long taking in some 47 summits. The Round has the reputation of being somewhat tougher to complete than its English Lake District equivalent, the Bob Graham Round.

Although no official time limit is set, an arbitrary 24 hours is applied, although the first completer exceeded the original aim of 24 hours.

Runners may start at any point on the circular route (finishing at the same place) and may run the course in either a clockwise or anticlockwise direction. The route takes in the well-known high mountain ranges of Snowdon, the Glyderau and the Carneddau as well as the slightly less visited ranges of Moel Siabod, the Moelwynion, Moel Hebog and the Nantlle Ridge. The route was devised by the eponymous Paddy Buckley and first completed in 1982 by Wendy Dodds. The selection of summits that must be visited is somewhat arbitrary and no rules appear to have been applied in selecting them . Generally, it takes in the major peaks of the ranges that are being crossed, then any minor tops that are passed along the way are also included. Some of these tops really are just bumps on the ridge and not really summits in their own right at all.

The fastest known completion of the round was, for many years, by Mark Hartell in 18 hours 10 minutes. On 4 May 2008, this time was matched by Chris Near of Eryri Harriers. This old record was broken in July 2009 by Tim Higginbottom who completed the Round in a time of 17 hours and 42 minutes. This was further reduced in 2019 by Damian Hall with 17 hours 31 minutes, and again on 30 August 2020 by Matthew Roberts with a time of 16 hours 38 minutes. Kim Collison set a new best time of 16 hours 20 minutes in April 2021. A year later, in April 2022, a new record was set by Finlay Wild who completed the round solo and unsupported in a time of 15 hours 14 minutes.

The women's record is held by Jasmin Paris with a time of 18 hours and 33 minutes, set in 2016.

The book "The Welsh Three Thousand Foot Challenges: A Guide for Walkers and Hill Runners"  describes a version of the route which avoids the slate quarries, which the fastest line utilises, and also suggests attempting it as a four-day backpacking (lightweight camping) excursion rather than a one-day run.

Route

Below is a list of the summits to be visited, in a clockwise direction, if starting from Llanberis.

Route profile
Below is a profile of the route, again starting and finishing at Llanberis, running in a clockwise direction.

References

Sport in Conwy County Borough
Sport in Gwynedd
Peak bagging in the United Kingdom
Challenge walks
Fell running challenges